John Marshall (born 18 August 1964) is a former professional English footballer, who played over 400 games in the Football League for Fulham.

Marshall signed for Fulham as a schoolboy and played in 411 matches scoring 29 goals in the Football League from 1982 to 1997. After retiring from playing, he went on to become a scout and coach.

As well as working as a coach, Marshall worked with his father-in-law, the former Southampton and Halifax Town player Fred Kemp, in the family business, supplying furniture to offices and schools.

References

External links

Living people
1964 births
Footballers from Balham
English footballers
Fulham F.C. players
Fulham F.C. non-playing staff
English Football League players
Association football midfielders
Wolverhampton Wanderers F.C. non-playing staff